Paul Okesene (14 November 1967 – 15 September 2012) was a Samoan rugby league footballer who represented both Western Samoa and American Samoa.

Background
His brother, Hitro, also played international rugby league.

Playing career
A Manukau Magpies junior in the Auckland Rugby League competition, Paul Okesene played for Western Samoa in 1986, at the Pacific Cup. He spent the 1988/89 season with the Sheffield Eagles.

In 1992, he again played in the Pacific Cup, this time for American Samoa.

In 1994, Paul Okesene played for the Counties Manukau Heroes in the new Lion Red Cup. He left the club at the end of the year, signing to play in France.

Later years
Paul died 15 September 2012 due to a heart attack. At the time of his death, he was working as a bus driver for French rugby union club USA Perpignan.

References

1967 births
2012 deaths
American Samoa national rugby league team players
Auckland rugby league team players
Counties Manukau rugby league team players
Junior Kiwis players
Manukau Magpies players
New Zealand rugby league players
New Zealand people of American Samoan descent
New Zealand sportspeople of Samoan descent
Rugby league players from Auckland
Rugby league wingers
Samoa national rugby league team players
Sheffield Eagles (1984) players